Otsego Lake State Park is a public recreation area covering  on the southeast shore of Otsego Lake in Otsego Lake Township, Otsego County, Michigan.

History
The park was among 13 parks established in 1920 following the creation of the Michigan State Parks Commission in 1919. Improvements made by the Civilian Conservation Corps in the 1930s included a wood-frame bathhouse constructed in 1934.

Activities and amenities
The park offers fishing, swimming, picnicking facilities, boat launch, and 155-site campground.

References

External links
Otsego Lake State Park Michigan Department of Natural Resources
Otsego Lake State Park Map Michigan Department of Natural Resources

State parks of Michigan
Protected areas of Otsego County, Michigan
Protected areas established in 1920
1920 establishments in Michigan
IUCN Category III
Civilian Conservation Corps in Michigan